Mecyclothorax monteithi is a species of ground beetle in the subfamily Psydrinae. It was described by Barry P. Moore in 1985.

References

monteithi
Beetles described in 1985